The Taishin International Bank (often abbreviated to Taishin Bank) is a bank headquartered in Taipei, Taiwan.

History
The bank was established on 25 February 1992 and inaugurated on 23 March the same year. The bank merged Dah An Commercial Bank and established Taishin Financial Holdings through share swap/share exchange in February 2002.

See also
 List of banks in Taiwan
 Economy of Taiwan
 List of companies of Taiwan

References

Taiwanese companies established in 1992
Banks of Taiwan
Companies based in Taipei
Banks established in 1992